The G.A.R. Hall and Museum is a historic museum at 58 Andrew Street in Lynn, Massachusetts.  

The four story Romanesque brick building was built in 1885 by contractor Frank G. Kelly to the design of the Lynn firm Wheeler & Northend for the General Frederick W. Lander Post 5 of the Grand Army of the Republic, an American Civil War veterans organization.  It has two storefronts on the ground floor, offices and a library with spaces for 1500 volumes on the second floor, and a large 46'10" x 56'4" meeting hall on the upper two floors.  The roofline originally had ornate brick crenellations, but these were removed in the mid 20th century.  The first two floors have also been altered over time, but the meeting hall remains in nearly original condition.  

The building was constructed with incandescent electric lighting by the Thomson-Houston Electric Company, which had moved to Lynn two years prior.

With declining membership in the organization, the building was turned over to the city in 1919 by a Special Act of the Massachusetts Legislature. The city operates it as a museum.

The building was listed on the National Register of Historic Places in 1979.

The building is the earliest known work by Holman K. Wheeler, who designed and constructed more than 400 structures in Lynn and surrounding towns, including residences, schools, commercial and factory buildings, and monuments. A total of five H. K. Wheeler structures in Lynn are listed on the National Register. 

The father of co-architect William Wheelwright Northend, Massachusetts State Senator William Dummer Northend, while attending Governor Dummer Academy as a child, became longtime friends with General Frederick W. Lander for whom the Lynn G.A.R. Post is named.

In 2018, a fundraising campaign was started to raise as much as $10 million for needed repairs, renovations, and preservation of the museum's collection. Plans include making the building ADA compliant with additions such as an elevator. An updated climate control system is also needed to preserve the museum artifacts.

The museum was named one of the top 11 most endangered historic resources in Massachusetts for 2018 by Preservation Massachusetts.

See also
Official Grand Army of the Republic Civil War Hall & Museum in Lynn, Massachusetts
Grand Army of the Republic Hall (Lynn, Massachusetts)
National Register of Historic Places listings in Lynn, Massachusetts
National Register of Historic Places listings in Essex County, Massachusetts
Lynn Grand Army of the Republic Museum page on the City of Lynn official website
Lynn Grand Army of the Republic Museum page on the Essex National Heritage Area website

References

Clubhouses on the National Register of Historic Places in Massachusetts
Buildings and structures in Lynn, Massachusetts
National Register of Historic Places in Lynn, Massachusetts
Grand Army of the Republic buildings and structures
Buildings and structures completed in 1885
Massachusetts in the American Civil War
1885 establishments in Massachusetts